The 1996 Bosch Spark Plug Grand Prix was a CART race which happened at the Nazareth Speedway on April 28, 1996. It was the 5th round of the 1996 IndyCar season.

Qualifying
Penske Racing driver Paul Tracy set the a mph speed of 190.737 mph, and also, the pole. It was a New Track Record.

Race

Start - Lap 95 
At lap 15, the first caution came out as Hiro Matsushita collided with Juan Manuel Fangio II. The restart came out at lap 22. The top ten at lap 25 were: Paul Tracy, Emerson Fittipaldi, Scott Pruett, Michael Andretti, Jimmy Vasser, Al Unser Jr., Bobby Rahal, Robby Gordon, Greg Moore and Christian Fittipaldi. At lap 53, Hiro Matsushita was the first driver to retire. At lap 79, Andretti stalled his car after a 13.4 pitstop. He continued in the race. At the following lap, the race leader Paul Tracy hit three mechanics in one move then after that he was able to stop his car in his pit stall. The mechanics were not badly injured, but were taken to the hospital. At lap 89, Paul Tracy received a black flag penalty because of the incident with his mechanics. The top six at lap 95 was: Michael Andretti, Al Unser Jr., Greg Moore, Emerson Fittipaldi, Bobby Rahal and Christian Fittipaldi.

Lap 115- Lap 141
At lap 115, the second caution came out, as Roberto Moreno lost one of his rear wheels. At the following lap, Gil de Ferran retired after having suspension problems due to colliding with Adrian Fernandez in the pits. The restart came out at lap 128. At lap 141, the top twelve was: Michael Andretti, Emerson Fittipaldi, Al Unser Jr., Greg Moore, Bobby Rahal, Jimmy Vasser, Paul Tracy, Scott Pruett, Christian Fittipaldi, Raul Boesel, Robby Gordon and Adrian Fernandez.

Closing stages. 33 laps to go
With 33 laps to go, the third caution came out as Robby Gordon hit the wall at turn one. He retired. When the restart would come out, Raul Boesel's engine blew up. The restart came out with 23 laps to go. Andretti's lead was growing and no problems happened to him as he won the race.

Final Results
 Michael Andretti
 Greg Moore
 Al Unser Jr.
 Emerson Fittipaldi
 Paul Tracy
 Bobby Rahal
 Jimmy Vasser
 Scott Pruett
 Christian Fittipaldi
 Adrian Fernandez
 Bryan Herta
 André Ribeiro
 Alex Zanardi
 Mike Groff
 Maurício Gugelmin
 Teo Fabi
 Eddie Lawson
 Jeff Krosnoff
 Stefan Johansson
 Parker Johnstone

Did not finish 
21. Raul Boesel engine

22. Robby Gordon contact

23. Gil de Ferran suspension

24. Roberto Moreno lost wheel

25. Juan Manuel Fangio II engine

26. Hiro Matsushita suspension

Points Standings after 5 races
 Jimmy Vasser 73 points
 Al Unser Jr. 53 points
 Scott Pruett 49 points
 Greg Moore 36 points
 Gil de Ferran 33 points
 Christian Fittipaldi 32 points

Notes
 Last race - Teo Fabi
 After this race, Mark Blundell, who broke his foot in Brazil was cleared by CART officials to race in the next round: The US 500.
 For the last time CART decided to run a 200 lap race in Nazareth Speedway. For 1997 until 2002 when CART had its final race there, it was a 225 lap race. After 2002, the race went to Indy Racing League, but it was still a 225 lap race.

Bosch Spark Plug Grand Prix, 1996